|}

The Hilly Way Chase is a Grade 2 National Hunt steeplechase in Ireland. It is run at Cork Racecourse in December, over a distance of about 2 miles and half a furlong (2 miles and 160 yards, or 3,365 metres).

The race was first run in 2001 as a Grade 3 race, before being awarded Grade 2 status in 2003. It is currently sponsored by the Kerry Group.

Records
Most successful horse (3 wins)
 Golden Silver (2009, 2010, 2011)

Leading jockey (7 wins):
 Paul Townend – Golden Silver (2009, 2010), Twinlight (2013), Douvan (2016), Castlegrace Paddy (2018), Chacun Pour Soi (2020), Energumene (2022) 

Leading trainer (14 wins):
 Willie Mullins - Our Ben (2007), Scotsirish (2008), Golden Silver (2009, 2010, 2011), Twinlight (2013), Felix Yonger (2014, 2015), Douvan (2016), Un De Sceaux (2017), Cilaos Emery (2019), Chacun Pour Soi (2020), Energumene (2021,2022)

Winners

See also
 Horse racing in Ireland
 List of Irish National Hunt races

References
 Racing Post:

National Hunt races in Ireland
National Hunt chases
Cork Racecourse
Recurring sporting events established in 2001
2001 establishments in Ireland